This is a timeline of the history of the British broadcaster Thames Television and its predecessor Associated-Rediffusion. Between them, they provided the ITV weekday service for London from 1955 to 1992, after which Thames continued as an independent production company until 2003.

Associated-Rediffusion

 1955
 22 September – At 7:15pm, ITV goes on air for the first time when Associated-Rediffusion starts broadcasting on weekdays to the London area.

 1956
 6 January – The first edition of current affairs programme This Week is broadcast.

 1957 to 1963
 No events.
 1964
 6 April – The name Associated-Rediffusion is dropped in favour of Rediffusion London, to reflect the cultural changes of the time, and output altered accordingly.
 Associated-Rediffusion is given a three-year extension to its licence. This is later extended by a further year.

 1965
 No events.

 1966
 No events.

 1967
 October – The Independent Television Authority announces that there was no place for Rediffusion in the redrawn franchise pattern. Also, ABC Weekend TV loses all its franchises along with the rights to take over the Midlands, held by ATV, or the London Weekend franchise, awarded to the London Television Consortium. ABPC, the parent company of ABC and BET, the parent company of Rediffusion, created Thames as a separate entity. Rediffusion's parent company, BET, takes a 49% stake in Thames, and was under-represented in the management of the new company – a state of affairs to which Rediffusion strongly objected. The ITA replied that either Thames or ABC take over. Rediffusion chose Thames.

1968
 29 July – Rediffusion London's last night on air.

Thames

1960s
 1968
 30 July – Thames Television starts broadcasting and its first week on air is disrupted by sporadic strike action.
 2 August – A technicians strike forces ITV off the air for several weeks although management manage to launch a temporary ITV Emergency National Service with no regional variations.

 1969
 17 November – Thames begins broadcasting in colour.
 19 November – Thames revives This Is Your Life, five years after it disappeared from BBC screens.

1970s 
 1970
 Following the launch of colour broadcasts, Thames’ famous ident is given a makeover and the drawings are replaced by photographs. It was to be used for the next 19 years.
 Thames sells off Television House, Rediffusion's former London headquarters, and moves to its newly constructed studios and offices to new premises on Euston Road.

 1971
 No events.

 1972
 16 October – Following a law change which removed all restrictions on broadcasting hours, ITV is able to launch an afternoon service.

 1973
 31 October – The first of 26 episodes of The World at War is broadcast. It took four years to produce.

 1974
 The 1974 franchise round sees no changes in ITV's contractors as it is felt that the huge cost in switching to colour television would have made the companies unable to compete against rivals in a franchise battle.

 1975
 No events.

 1976
 1 December – Bill Grundy’s infamous interview with The Sex Pistols takes place on Thames’ teatime magazine show Today.

 1977
 May – A strike occurs when production assistants at Thames refuse to operate new video equipment. Thames proceeded to sack all the technicians for breach of contract. The following month, both sides backed down over the issues, with all technicians returning to work.
 12 September – Today is replaced by a more conventional news magazine Thames at Six.

 1978
 5 September – Thames launches a lunchtime regional news bulletin.

 1979
 6 August – A strike, initiated at Thames, spreads to the entire ITV network, apart from Channel, forcing ITV off air for ten weeks.
 Thames News at Six is renamed Thames News.

1980s 
 1980
 28 April – A late night Thames News bulletin is launched. It had originally been planned to launch at the same time as the lunchtime bulletin but was delayed due to union problems.
 2 October – Thames broadcasts a 10-hour Telethon to raise money for good causes in the London area.

 1981
 No events.

 1982
 1 January – 
 Thames (and LWT) are no longer able to broadcast to north west Kent due to the Bluebell Hill transmitter near Maidstone being transferred to the new Television South, as part of the creation of the south and south east franchise. 
 Thames loses 105 minutes of transmission time on Fridays when the handover to LWT is moved back from 7pm to 5:15pm. 
 8 January – Due to the earlier Friday start, LWT becomes contractually responsible for providing a Friday London news service. Rather than launch its own news service, LWT pays Thames to provide a 15-minute insert into The Six O'Clock Show, LWT’s Friday teatime magazine. The bulletin is called Thames Weekend News.

 1983
 1 February – Following the launch of ITV’s breakfast television service, TV-am,  Thames’ broadcast day now begins at 9:25am.

 1984
 27 August – The first of two strikes over new shift patterns takes place. It is resolved on 3 September.
 16 October – The Bill launches as a regular programme, just over a year after a one-off episode – Woodentop – was shown.
 17 October – Another strike begins over the same issue, and also over new technologies. 
 19 October – A management-operated schedule is introduced. It broadcasts programming between around 1:30pm and around midnight as well as the ITV breakfast service TV-am. For the intervening four hours, instead of schools programmes, Thames viewers were left with a blue screen showing their upcoming emergency schedule. And with no access to ITN News, Thames viewers had to make do with short Thames News bulletins. Weekend ITV schedules for the London region are not affected by the strike, with London Weekend Television coming on air on Fridays at 5:15pm as usual.
 3 November – The strike finally ends, after 62 film editors agreed to the new conditions, while the ACTT agreed as well to start negotiations about the introductions of new technology. Additional episodes of network productions were screened to help clear the backlog.
The Thames ident is computerised.

 1985
 3 January – The last day of transmission using the 405-lines system.
 January – Thames does a deal with the international distributors for US production company Lorimar to purchase the UK broadcasting rights for US drama Dallas, at that time transmitted on BBC1. This broke a gentlemen's agreement between the two sides not to poach each other's imported shows.
 After Thorn EMI and British Electric Traction (BET) decide to reduce their share of Thames, Carlton Communications executes a failed take-over bid for Thames. The IBA, blocked the takeover, after concluding that 'the proposal would lead to a major change in the nature and characteristic of a viable ITV programme company'.

 1986
 3 July – Thames is partially floated on the stock market. The shares on offer were the 71.2 stake of Thames that were being sold by BET and Thorn EMI.
 11 September – After a seven year hiatus, This Week returns.

 1987
 1 June – Thames launches Thames Into the Night, broadcasting until around 4am. Consequently, Thames no longer broadcasts its end of day epilogue Night Thoughts.
 17 August – Thames begins 24-hour transmissions.
 7 September – Following the transfer of ITV Schools to Channel 4, ITV provides a full morning programme schedule, with advertising, for the first time. The new service includes regular five-minute national and regional news bulletins.

 1988
 At the start of 1988, weekend contractor LWT launches its own regional news service, ending the agreement whereby Thames produced the Friday evening regional news insert into LWT’s Friday night magazine programme The Six O'Clock Show.
 8 April – Thames transmits the controversial documentary Death on the Rock as part of its This Week series.

 1989
 July – To mark its 21st anniversary, the famous skyline ident is replaced with a new logo.
 1 September – Thames adopts the new corporate ITV logo.

1990s 
 1990
 3 September – Thames launches what will be its final ident although it is only used to introduce local programmes. A modified ITV generic ident featuring this new logo is used for networked shows.

 1991
 April – Thames, in conjunction with LWT, launches a new overnight strand ITV Night Time. 
 16 October – Thames loses its ITV licence to Carlton Television due to it not being the highest bidder.
 4 November – Following the announcement of the loss of its franchise, Thames drops the ITV-branded ident in favour of the local ident which is now to introduce all programmes.

 1992
 Spring – To try to continue as a television broadcaster, Thames gets involved with a bid for the new Channel 5 licence. The bid is unsuccessful when the Independent Television Commission rejected it on concerns about its business plan and investor backing.
 1 November – Thames joins with the BBC to launch UK Gold. The channel shows programmes from the Thames and BBC archives.
 17 December – Ahead of the loss of its franchise, the final edition of the Thames Television-produced current affairs series This Week is broadcast.
 31 December – At 11:59pm Thames stops broadcasting as after the chimes of Big Ben, the new licensee, Carlton Television takes over as franchise holder for London weekdays.

 1993
 After losing its franchise, Thames continues to operate as a programme maker meaning that many of its popular shows continue to be seen. These include The Bill and This Is Your Life. This Is Your Life continued to run on ITV until around 1995 when ITV cancelled it and the series was recommissioned by the BBC, with Thames continuing to produce it. The corporation ended the series in 2003. The Bill continued on ITV until 2010.
23 April – Pearson Television launches a friendly takeover bid for Thames Television, valuing the company at £99 million. The acquisition is completed during the summer.

2000s 
 2003
 	10 February – Thames is merged with Talkback to form a new production company Talkback Thames. The Thames name would be resurrected as a new company in 2012.

See also 
 History of ITV
 History of ITV television idents
 Timeline of ITV
 Timeline of London Weekend Television – supplying the weekend service against Thames' weekday service
 Timeline of Carlton Television – Thames' successor
 Timeline of television in London

References

Thames Television
ThamesTelevision